A film projector or movie projector is a device used for projection of moving images from film.

Film projector may also refer to:
Slide projector for projection of still images from film

See also
Projector (disambiguation)